Oleśnica (pronounced  ;) is a town in Lower Silesian Voivodeship, in south-western Poland, within the Wrocław metropolitan area. It is the administrative seat of Oleśnica County and also of the rural district of Gmina Oleśnica,  although it is not part of the territory of the latter, the town being an urban gmina in its own right.

The town is famed for its large 16th-century castle, which has previously been the seat of several dukes and lords. The castle's inner courtyard arcades, a masterpiece of Renaissance architecture, are iconic in the region.

Name
The town's name comes from Polish olsza ("Alder"); Olcha is an Old Slavic word for this common plant and tree. On 22 February 1255 the Silesian duke Henry III the White, son of the Polish High Duke Henry II the Pious, vested civitas nostra Olsnicz ("our town Oleśnica") with town privileges.

Geography
The town is situated in the Silesian Lowlands east of the Trzebnickie Hills, part of the historical region of Lower Silesia. It was the site of an important printing press and gymnasium.

The town quarters are Centrum, Serbinów, Lucień, Lucień Osiedle, Wądoły, Rataje (Stare, Nowe) and Zielone Ogrody.

History 

The Piast castle with a nearby abbey and trading settlement was first mentioned in an 1189 deed. It was part of fragmented Poland under the Piast dynasty. In 1255, it was granted town rights by Duke Henry III the White. From the 13th century onwards, the area was largely settled by Germans in the course of the Ostsiedlung. From the 13th century, it had a coin mint. In the 13th century Oleśnica was part of the Duchy of Silesia, in 1294 it became part of the Duchy of Głogów and in 1313 it became capital of the Duchy of Oleśnica, just partitioned from Głogów. By that time a hospital already existed in Oleśnica, mentioned in a document from 1307. From 1320/21 the former castellany served as the residence of the Piast duke Konrad I of Oleśnica; his son Duke Konrad II the Gray also inherited Koźle. The dukes of Oleśnica in the 14th century still claimed to be heirs of the entire Kingdom of Poland, even though they ruled only in their principality, which caused animosity from other Polish dukes in Silesia and monarchs of all Poland. Oleśnica was located on an important trade route which connected Wrocław with Kalisz and Toruń.

In 1329, Duke Konrad I was forced to accept the overlordship of the Bohemian (Czech) Crown, although he retained vast autonomy. Local Polish dukes granted numerous privileges to Oleśnica, and the Duchy of Oleśnica was still ruled from the town until the 1492 death of Duke Konrad X the White, last of the local Piasts. During the Hussite Wars, Oleśnica was invaded by the Hussites in 1432, and later Polish–Hussite negotiations took place there. During the Bohemian–Hungarian War local dukes switched sides several times. In 1469 they recognized the overlordship of King Matthias Corvinus of Hungary, in the 1470s Duke Konrad X sided with Bohemian King Vladislaus Jagiellon, in 1480 he recognized Hungarian suzerainty again, and then revolted in 1489. Afterwards it was again a Bohemian fief.

According to an agreement from 1491, the duchy was supposed to pass to future Polish King John I Albert, but eventually in 1495 it was sold to Duke Henry I of Münsterberg, son of the Bohemian (Czech) king George of Poděbrady. His grandson Duke John of Münsterberg-Oels established a gymnasium at Oleśnica in 1530. When the Czech Podiebrad family became extinct in 1647, town and duchy were inherited by the Swabian dukes of Württemberg, and in 1792 by the Welf dukes of Brunswick-Lüneburg.

On September 11, 1535, a violent F4 tornado completely destroyed part of the town. The written account of this tornado was done by Dr. Alfred Wegener, which is in the CLIMDAT archive located at Leipzig University and the F4 rating on the Fujita scale was assigned by the European Severe Storms Laboratory.

In the 17th century, the Polish-German language border ran close to Oleśnica, including the town to the territory dominated by the Polish language. Polish religious writers Adam Gdacius (nicknamed Rey of Silesia) and Jerzy Bock published their works in Oleśnica.

In the 18th century, one of two main routes connecting Warsaw and Dresden ran through the town and Kings Augustus II the Strong and Augustus III of Poland often traveled that route. As a result of the First Silesian War the Duchy of Oels (Oleśnica) came under suzerainty of the Kingdom of Prussia in 1742. Following administrative reform in 1807 during the Napoleonic Wars, Oels became the seat of Landkreis Oels in the Province of Silesia, remaining capital of the Duchy of Oels (Oleśnica). In 1884 the duchy was incorporated into Prussia, itself part of Germany since the 1871 Prussian-led unification of Germany.

After World War I, Oels was included within the Province of Lower Silesia. Nazi Germany operated a prison in the town, and a forced labour camp for Italian, English, Yugoslavian, Belgian and Polish prisoners of war during World War II. The German administration evacuated almost the entire population, leaving only a few Germans and the forced laborers. The town was heavily damaged by the Red Army in 1945 in the final stages of World War II, having approximately 60-80% of its buildings destroyed. The city was placed in Poland's borders after the Potsdam Conference and its official name became Oleśnica. The remaining German-speaking population was subsequently expelled in accordance to the Potsdam Agreement and the town was resettled with Poles many of whom were expelled from Eastern Poland annexed in 1945 by the Soviet Union. The majority of monuments in the Old Town have been rebuilt since the 1960s.

Sports
Football club Pogoń Oleśnica is based in the town. It played at the Polish second division in the 1990s.

Notable people

 Joachim of Münsterberg-Oels (1503–1562), Duke of Münsterberg and from 1536 to 1542 also Duke of Oels 
 Hedwig of Münsterberg-Oels (1508–1531), Margravine of Brandenburg-Ansbach-Kulmbach
 John, Duke of Münsterberg-Oels (1509–1565), Duke of the Münsterberg from 1542 to 1565, Duke of Oels from 1548 to 1565 and Duke of Bernstadt from 1548 to 1565 
 George II, Duke of Münsterberg-Oels (1512–1553), Duke of Münsterberg from 1536 to 1542 and Duke of Oels
 Henry III, Duke of Münsterberg-Oels (1542–1587), Duke of Münsterberg from 1565 to 1574 and Duke of Bernstadt
 Karl II, Duke of Münsterberg-Oels (1545–1617), Duke of Oels from 1565 to 1617 and Duke of Bernstadt from 1604 to 1617
 Karl Christoph, Duke of Münsterberg (1545–1569), Duke of Münsterberg from 1565 to 1569
 Henry Wenceslaus, Duke of Oels-Bernstadt (1592–1639) 
 Abraham von Franckenberg (1593–1652), mystic, born in nearby Bystre
 Karl Friedrich I, Duke of Münsterberg-Oels (1593–1647),  Duke of Oels from 1617 to 1647 and Duke of Bernstadt from 1639 to 1647
 Elisabeth Marie, Duchess of Oels (1625–1686), German noblewoman
 Christian Ulrich I, Duke of Württemberg-Oels (1652–1704), German nobleman, Duke of Württemberg-Bernstadt from 1669 to 1697 and Duke of Oels-Württemberg from 1697 until his death
 Julius Siegmund, Duke of Württemberg-Juliusburg (1653–1684), was Duke of Württemberg-Juliusburg
 Eugen of Württemberg (1788–1857), general
 Carl Heinrich Zöllner (1792–1836), German composer
 Julius Hübner (1806–1882), painter
 Gustav Becker (1819–1885), clockmaker
 Willy Hellpach (1877–1955), physicist and politician
 Antoni Cieszyński (1882–1941), surgeon
 Werner Krolikowski (born 1928), East German politician
 Sigmar Polke (1941–2010), artist
 Piotr Czech (born 1986), kicker for Pittsburgh Steelers
 Wojciech Bartnik (born 1967), boxer, Olympic bronze medallist
 Kasia Glowicka (born 1977), composer
 Jerzy Rogalski (born 1948), film and theatre actor
 Rafał Dębski (born 1969), Polish writer
 Babatunde Aiyegbusi (born 1989), Polish-Nigerian professional wrestler and former American football player

Twin towns – sister cities

Oleśnica is twinned with:
 Chrudim, Czech Republic
 Jaunay-Marigny, France
 Warendorf, Germany

Gallery

References

External links

 Municipal website
 Panorama Oleśnicka 
 News from Oleśnica 
 History of Oleśnica 
 Old postcards from Oleśnica 
 Jewish Community in Oleśnica on Virtual Shtetl
 Ads and News from Oleśnica 

Cities and towns in Lower Silesian Voivodeship
Oleśnica County
Cities in Silesia